Byways Cafe was a diner in the Pearl District of Portland, Oregon, United States. Owners, Collin McFadden and Megan Brinkley, opened the restaurant in 1999, serving American breakfast and brunch comfort foods such as corned beef hash, omelets, and pancakes. Guy Fieri visited the diner for a 2007 episode of the Food Network show, Diners, Drive-Ins and Dives. Byways received generally positive receptions and was voted the city's "best brunch spot" by readers of The Oregonian in 2016. It closed in late 2019, after the owners were unable to reach a lease agreement with the landlord.

Description

The diner was located along Glisan Street in northwest Portland's Pearl District. Andi Prewitt of Willamette Week described Byways as a "classic diner accented with red vinyl booths and lunch counter stools along with a black-and-white checkered floor". The menu included comfort food such as corned beef hash, pancakes, scrambles, and milkshakes. Hollyanna McCollom's 2016 guide book, Moon Portland, says "locals have been flocking here for years to sample the omelets, scrambles, and corned beef hash. Byways is also famous for its blue corn pancakes, made with ground blue corn and served with honey pecan butter." In 2019, Alex Frane from Eater Portland said that Byways had served:
"A menu that has remained more or less constant: American breakfast and brunch classics like French toast, monte cristos, biscuits and gravy, and all sorts of egg scrambles and omelets, as well as a lunch menu of burgers and sandwiches. The vibe, too, is that of a classic American family-owned diner, with kitschy displays like decorative plates and license plates."

History

Owners Collin McFadden and Megan Brinkley opened Byways in 1999. The space was previously occupied by Shakers Cafe, operated by Jeani Subotnick and Bruce Bauer, from 1991 to 1998. Shakers's decor was described as "kitschy-cool, with collections of salt and pepper shakers all over the place and chrome counter stools that evoked a bygone era". The cafe was known for "homemade pies, massive pancakes, killer scones, and cup after cup of strong coffee". Cindy's Helvetia Cafe briefly operated in the space after Shakers. 

Guy Fieri visited Byways in 2007, for a "retro-themed" episode on the first season of the Food Network's Diners, Drive-Ins and Dives, during which he "raved about the corned beef hash and Brinkley's house-made desserts".

Closure

In November 2019, McFadden and Brinkley announced plans to close before the end of the year. They were unable to reach a lease agreement with the building's owners. The duo wrote on Facebook,
"It's been well known that our building has been for sale for almost 2 years and that we have never had the resources to buy it ourselves. Unfortunately we haven't been able to work out a lease that will allow us to keep Byways moving along like it always has. We will miss the community space that Byways has become, and the time spent with staff, customers, and family."
Additionally, they invited patrons for a "last meal" and expressed an eagerness to move on, writing:

Reception
In 2008, Ted Wheeler said that Byways Cafe was his favorite restaurant. Byways was listed as an "editors' choice" in the eighth edition of the guide book, Best Places: Portland (2010). In Moon Portland, McCollom stated, "The corn cakes are good, but nothing compares to the amaretto French toast". She advised, "The weekend wait can be long here, as at many Portland restaurant joints. To make it more bearable, arrive early, bring something to read, and pick up something caffeinated on the way." In 2016, readers of The Oregonian voted Byways the city's "best brunch spot" in an online "People's Choice" poll. Byways gained support using social media and earned 23 percent of the vote. The newspaper's Lizzy Acker ranked the diner fourth in her 2019 list of the city's top 25 corned beef hashes, writing: 

Following confirmation of the pending closure, Michael Russell of The Oregonian said the diner was "one of Portland's longest-running and best-loved brunch spots, a tchotchke-filled slice of Americana that felt out of time even before its surrounding Pearl District neighborhood grew up all around it". Willamette Week And Prewitt described Byways as "one of Portland's breakfast institutions". Wm. Steven Humphrey of the Portland Mercury described Byways as "adorable and yummy" and considered the confirmed closure as "probably the saddest food news of the week".

Eater Portland Alex Frane called Byways a "longstanding and beloved breakfast spot" and said its closure made "a sizable dent in the Pearl District's breakfast scene". The website's Brooke Jackson-Glidden also called Byways a "Portland breakfast institution". In December 2019, Sander Gusinow of Oregon Business said the diner's closure, along with the closing of Little Bird Bistro, explained why "restaurant entrepreneurs would err on the side of caution when it comes to opening dining venues downtown".

See also

 List of defunct restaurants of the United States
 List of diners
 List of Diners, Drive-Ins and Dives episodes

References

External links

 
 Byways Cafe at Food Network
 Byways Cafe at Zagat
 Byways Cafe at Zomato

1999 establishments in Oregon
2019 disestablishments in Oregon
Defunct restaurants in Portland, Oregon
Diners in Portland, Oregon
Pearl District, Portland, Oregon
Restaurants disestablished in 2019
Restaurants established in 1999